Stardust... the Great American Songbook, Volume III is the third studio album of pop standards by British musician Rod Stewart, released on 19 October 2004 by J Records, and his 22nd album overall. The album was dedicated to the Tartan Army.

The album was Rod Stewart's first #1 on the Billboard 200 since Blondes Have More Fun in 1979. It later became the winner of the 2004 Award for Best Traditional Pop Vocal Album, giving Stewart his first and, to date, only Grammy victory in his career.

Track listing

Notes
  signifies a co-producer

Personnel 
 Rod Stewart – lead vocals
 Ken Ascher – acoustic piano (1, 2, 4, 6, 8, 10, 12, 13, 14), additional keyboards (1-4, 6-12, 14), additional synthesizer (1-4, 6-12, 14)
 Joe Sample – acoustic piano (3)
 Mike Thompson – acoustic piano (5), synthesizers (5), rhythm arrangements (5, 13)
 Andy Chuckerman – synthesizers (5)
 Dave Grusin – acoustic piano (7, 9)
 Jon Allen – additional keyboards (7)
 Alan Pasqua – acoustic piano (11)
 Louis Forestieri – synthesizers (13)
 Bob Mann – guitar (1-4, 6, 7, 8, 10, 11, 12, 14), additional keyboards (1-4, 6-12, 14), additional synthesizer (1-4, 6-12, 14) arrangements and conductor (1-4, 6-12), rhythm arrangements (14)
 Eric Clapton – guitar solo (3)
 Vin D'Onofrio – guitar (5, 13) 
 Bob Cranshaw – bass (1-4, 7, 12)
 Chris Golden – bass (5)
 David Finck – bass (6)
 Chip Jackson – bass (8, 9, 11)
 Ed Howard – bass (10)
 Reggie McBride – bass (13)
 John Beale – bass (14)
 Allan Schwartzberg – drums (1-4, 6-12)
 John Ferraro – drums (5, 13, 14)
 Stevie Wonder – harmonica (4)
 Dave Koz – saxophone solo (2, 8)
 Warren Luening – clarinet (6), saxophone (6), trumpet (6), trumpet solo (7)
 Bob Sheppard – clarinet (6), saxophone (6), trumpet (6)
 Plas Johnson – saxophone solo (10)
 Tom Evans – saxophone solo (13)
 Warren Vaché Jr. – trumpet solo (1, 9)
 Lee Thornberg – trumpet solo (5)
 Arturo Sandoval – trumpet solo (11)
 Richard Perry – rhythm arrangements (5, 13)
 Alan Broadbent – string arrangements and conductor (14)
 Michael Markman – concertmaster (1-4, 6, 7, 9, 11, 12, 14)
 Antoine Silverman – concertmaster (8, 10), violin solo (14)
 Stephen Erdody, Tim Landauer, David Low and Steve Richards – cello (1-4, 6, 7, 9, 11, 12, 14)
 Sarah Carter, Danny Miller and Anja Wood – cello (8, 10)
 Brian Denbow, Janet Lakatos, Jorge Moraga, Dan Neufeld, Simon Oswell, Nancy Roth and David Walther – viola (1-4, 6, 7, 9, 11, 12, 14)
 David Cresswell, Danielle Farina, Debbie Shufelt and Jessica Troy – viola (8, 10)
 Roberto Cani, Franklyn D'Antonio, Bruce Dukov, Julia Gigante, Endre Granat, Ann Landauer, Edie Markman, Michael Markman, Robert Peterson, Katia Popov, Barbara Porter, Gil Romero, Haim Shtrum and Kenneth Yerke – violin (1-4, 6, 7, 9, 11, 12, 14)
 Martin Agee, Chris Cardona, Cenovia Cummings, Jonathan Dinklage, Sylvia D'Avanzo, Max Moston, Antoine Silverman, Belinda Whitney and Paul Woodiel – violin (8, 10) 
 Dorian Holley – backing vocals (4)
 Mortonette Jenkins – backing vocals (4)
 Marlena Jeter – backing vocals (4)
 Bette Midler – lead vocals (6)
 Dolly Parton – lead vocals (12)

Production
 Executive Producer – Clive Davis
 Producers – Steve Tyrell (Tracks 1-4, 6-12 & 14); Richard Perry (Tracks 5 & 13)
 Co-Producer on Tracks 5 & 13 – Lauren Wild
 Production Coordination on Tracks 1-4, 6-12 & 14 – Jon Allen
 Production Manager on Tracks 5 & 13 – Ben McCarthy, assisted by Shauna Krikorian.
 A&R – Steve Ferrera
 Recording – Bobby Ginsburg (Tracks 1-4, 6-12 & 14); Carter William Humphrey (Track 5); J.J. Blair (Track 13).
 Assistant recording on Tracks 1-4, 6-12 & 14 – Ryan Petrie
 Additional Engineers – Helen Atkinson, Darwin Best, Raj Das, Doug Epstein, Michael Teaney and Steve Tyrell (Tracks 1-4, 6-12 & 14); Dusk Bennett, Adam Hawkins, Carter William Humphrey, Manny Sanchez and Nick Sample (Tracks 5 & 13).
 Strings on Tracks 1-4, 6-12 & 14 recorded by Bill Schnee
 Guitar solo on Track 3 recorded by Simon Climie, assisted by Joel Evenden.
 Mixed by Andy Zulla at Sound Decision Studios (New York, NY).
 Mastered by Joe Yannece at The Hit Factory (New York, NY).
 Creative Director – Alli Truch
 Art Direction and Design – Jeri Heiden and John Heiden
 Photography – Andrew MacPherson and Penny Lancaster
 Management – Arnold Stiefel for Stiefel Entertainment, assisted Jackie Oberhauser.
 Project Manager – Lotus Donovan
 Liner Notes – Rod Stewart
 Sound Engineer – Ariel Solanes

Charts

Weekly charts

Year-end charts

Certifications

References

2004 albums
Albums produced by Clive Davis
Albums produced by Richard Perry
Grammy Award for Best Traditional Pop Vocal Album
Rod Stewart albums
Traditional pop albums
Albums recorded at RAK Studios
Albums recorded at United Western Recorders
Covers albums